Duqmaq (also spelled Dukmak or Doqmaq)  is a Syrian village located in the Ziyarah Subdistrict of the al-Suqaylabiyah District in Hama Governorate. According to the Syria Central Bureau of Statistics (CBS), Duqmaq had a population of 1,042 in the 2004 census. Its inhabitants are predominantly Sunni Muslims.

References 

Populated places in al-Suqaylabiyah District